WSVO (93.1 FM) is an Adult Contemporary formatted broadcast radio station licensed to Staunton, Virginia and serving Staunton and Augusta County, Virginia. WSVO is owned and operated by iHeartMedia.

History
WSVO first launched with the callsign WSGM on May 29, 1959, and carried a mainstream rock format.

The station became country on February 13, 1992, and changed the callsign to WKDW-FM, becoming a sister station of WKDW at 900 AM, which was also carrying a country format. WKDW-FM remained a sister station of WKDW until March 28, 1994, when the callsign for 900 AM was switched to WBGT. It was also around this time that the station's format was switched from a Country format to Oldies, branded as "Oldies 93.1".

On January 31, 1996, the WKDW callsign was reassigned to 900 AM, while 93.1 FM became WSVO. The station continued to carry its oldies format until 11:00 P.M. on April 3, 2005, when the format was changed to adult contemporary, branded as "Mix 93.1; The 80s to Now".

The station broadcasts in an all-Christmas format from mid-November through Christmas day.

References

External links
 Mix 93-1 Online
 

SVO
Mainstream adult contemporary radio stations in the United States
Radio stations established in 1959
IHeartMedia radio stations